Jeepster Records is an English, London-based independent record label, founded in 1995, and specializing in British indie and alternative bands, particularly Glasgow-based acts. It is most notable for its signing of Belle and Sebastian and Snow Patrol.

Early success
Jeepster Records was founded in 1995 by Mark Jones and Stefano D’Andrea, through a mutual interest in the contemporary indie scene. Following their establishment and after extensive scouting, the label signed their first act, the newly formed Belle and Sebastian, in August 1996. In November of the same year, the band's first album with Jeepster, If You're Feeling Sinister was released. This established both Belle & Sebastian and Jeepster, and enabled them to release several EPs with Belle & Sebastian throughout 1997, as well as signing their second act, Snow Patrol, later in the year. 1998 then saw increased activity, with the signing of Salako, and the release of albums for all three of their signed bands; most notably Belle & Sebastian's The Boy With The Arab Strap.

The label's strong relationship with Belle & Sebastian enabled them in 1999 to sign Stuart David's side-project Looper, and Isobel Campbell's solo project The Gentle Waves, releasing albums for each that same year, along with a string of EPs and singles for their entire roster. The label enjoyed further good publicity when Belle & Sebastian won Best Newcomer in the 1999 Brit Awards. Later that year, Jeepster reissued Belle & Sebastian's debut album Tigermilk, which had previously been available only on limited issue vinyl.

2000 saw new albums released for Belle & Sebastian, Looper, and The Gentle Waves, as well as Belle & Sebastian's first appearance on Top of the Pops. Towards the end of the year, the label released the It's a Cool Cool Christmas compilation in association with XFM, with proceeds going to The Big Issue charity. The album was only available during this Christmas period, and featured Belle & Sebastian and Snow Patrol, as well as numerous other bands such as The Flaming Lips and Teenage Fanclub. The following year finally marked the release of Snow Patrol's second album When It's All Over We Still Have To Clear Up, which, despite slightly disappointing initial sales, would eventually go gold in the wake of the band's later fame, along with their debut Songs For Polarbears.

Dormant period
Despite critical acclaim for its acts, Jeepster was financially troubled by 2002, largely due to increasing recording and marketing costs, and difficulty cultivating the images of their acts in the eye of the general public. This forced the label into a corner, and they had no choice but to decline renewal of the contracts of their most successful artists in order to continue producing their existing catalogue. While they were unable to retain their signed artists and didn’t consider signing new acts for this period, there were several additions to the catalogue in the next few years.

The label released a Belle & Sebastian DVD in 2003, Fans Only, and, in 2005, Push Barman to Open Old Wounds, a compilation comprising all of Belle & Sebastian's singles and EPs released under Jeepster. This was followed in 2006 by re-releases of Songs for Polarbears and When It's All Over We Still Have to Clear Up, including previously unreleased bonus tracks.

Later signings
In a stronger financial position by April 2006, Jeepster announced its first new signing in years, Reading-based act SixNationState. Following renewed scouting of the Glasgow underground scene, the label soon after announced the signing of another band, Parka, in November of the same year.

Following several singles releases by both bands, the label released its first new album in six and a half years in late 2007: SixNationState's self-titled debut album. In May 2008, Parka's own debut, Attack of the Hundred Yard Hardman was also released.

Before the end of 2008, Jeepster would release another Belle & Sebastian compilation, The BBC Sessions, collecting the tracks that the band had recorded for the BBC in 1996, which included rarities and unreleased songs, together with live recordings from Belfast.

Jeepster contributed six songs to the Polydor Records Snow Patrol compilation Up To Now in 2009.

Discography
If You're Feeling Sinister - Belle & Sebastian (1996)
Dog On Wheels - Belle & Sebastian (1997)
Lazy Line Painter Jane - Belle & Sebastian (1997)
3.. 6.. 9 Seconds of Light - Belle & Sebastian (1997)
Little Hide - Snow Patrol (1998)
100 Things You Should Have Done In Bed - Snow Patrol (1998)
Growing Up In The Night - Salako (1998)
Re-Inventing Punctuation - Salako (1998)
Songs for Polarbears - Snow Patrol (1998)
The Boy with the Arab Strap - Belle & Sebastian (1998)
Velocity Girl/Absolute Gravity - Snow Patrol (1998)
The Moonlight Radiates A Purple Glow In His World - Salako (1998)
This Is Just a Modern Rock Song - Belle & Sebastian (1998)
Ballad Of Ray Suzuki - Looper (1999)
Up A Tree - Looper (1999)
Weathershow - The Gentle Waves (1999)
The Green Fields of Foreverland - The Gentle Waves (1999)
The Bird In The Bag - Salako (1999)
Starfighter Pilot - Snow Patrol (1999)
Tigermilk - Belle & Sebastian (1999)
Musicality - Salako (1999)
Mappleton Sands 20/12/98 - Salako (1999)
Who's Afraid Of Y2K - Looper (1999)
Mondo '77 - Looper (2000)
Ventimiglia 12/08/99 - Salako (2000)
The Geometrid - Looper (2000)
Legal Man - Belle & Sebastian (2000)
Fold Your Hands Child, You Walk Like a Peasant - Belle & Sebastian (2000)
Falling from Grace - The Gentle Waves (2000)
Ask Me How I Am - Snow Patrol (2000)
Swansong for You - The Gentle Waves (2000)
It's a Cool Cool Christmas - Various Artists (2000)
One Night Is Not Enough - Snow Patrol (2001)
When It's All Over We Still Have To Clear Up - Snow Patrol (2001)
Jonathan David - Belle & Sebastian (2001)
I'm Waking Up To Us - Belle & Sebastian (2001)
Storytelling - Belle & Sebastian (2002)
Fans Only (DVD) - Belle & Sebastian (2003)
Push Barman to Open Old Wounds - Belle & Sebastian (2005)
Songs For Polarbears (reissue) - Snow Patrol (2006)
When It's All Over We Still Have To Clear Up (reissue) - Snow Patrol (2006)
Fire! - SixNationState (2006)
Where Are You Now? - SixNationState (2007)
If You Wanna? - Parka (2007)
We Could Be Happy - SixNationState (2007)
SixNationState - SixNationState (2007)
Disco Dancer - Parka (2008)
Better Anyway - Parka (2008)
Attack Of The Hundred Yard Hardman - Parka (2008)
The BBC Sessions - Belle & Sebastian (2008)

See also
List of independent UK record labels
Lists of record labels

References

External links
 Official website

British independent record labels
Indie rock record labels
Record labels established in 1995
1995 establishments in England
Record labels based in London